{{DISPLAYTITLE:C15H11O5}}
The molecular formula C15H11O5 (or C15H11O5+, molar mass: 271.24 g/mol, exact mass: 271.0606 u) may refer to:

 Fisetinidin, an anthocyanidin
 Luteolinidin, an anthocyanidin
 Pelargonidin, an anthocyanidin

Molecular formulas